The Diary of Samuel Pepys is a British historical television series which was originally broadcast on the BBC in 1958. Based on the diaries of the naval administrator Samuel Pepys, it portrays life at the court of Charles II during the 1660s.

Main cast
 Peter Sallis as Samuel Pepys
 Susan Maryott as Elizabeth Pepys
 Alan Rowe as William Hewer
 Diana Fairfax as Lady Castlemaine 
 David Peel as  Duke of York
 Douglas Wilmer as King Charles II
 Manning Wilson as Lord Sandwich
 Paul Eddington as Sir William Coventry 
 John Arnatt as Duke of Albemarle 
 Howard Lamb as  William Bowyer 
 Anthony Newlands as Sir William Penn 
 John Sharplin as John Evelyn
 Frederick Peisley as John Pepys
 Raymond Rollett as Sir John Minnes
 Jill Carey as Duchess of York

Review
This series was Peter Sallis's first appearance as a principal character on television. A reason for this was that he bore a resemblance when compared to contemporary picture portraits of Samuel Pepys. The series was dramatised by A R Rawlinson for Chloe Gibson. Incidentally, Chloe Gibson was one of the first female producers for BBC television.

Using the diaries as a template, Sallis captured the wit, verve and cheeky humour of Pepys and was rightly lauded for his performance.

References

Bibliography
Baskin, Ellen . Serials on British Television, 1950-1994. Scolar Press, 1996.

External links
 

BBC television dramas
1958 British television series debuts
1958 British television series endings
English-language television shows
Television series set in the 17th century